Collegium Intermarium is a university located in Warsaw, Poland. The university was founded in 2021 and opened with an inauguration conference on 28 May. The university was inaugurated by Education for Values Foundation and is also linked to Ordo Iuris, a conservative legal Polish think tank known for its protection of traditional values and Christian ethics.

History 

Collegium Intermarium is the first university registered in Poland after the major . The name of the university refers to the countries of the Intermarium region, which was a geopolitical project conceived by politicians in successor states of the former Polish–Lithuanian Commonwealth. The name of the university reflects the intention to support and cooperate with the community of the Intermarium region.

The project is intended to promote conservative causes in Europe based on Roman legal culture, Greek philosophy and Christian ethics. The university offers accredited degrees at the master's level in law, with the curriculum to include related subjects like the history of law and philosophy. In addition, several postgraduate degree courses are launched in the fall of 2021, including Ethics degree for school teachers; Classical Europe: Politics, Culture and Art of Debate; NGO Management and Forensic Science. It plans to offer a PhD program in four to five years. The university says it will be privately funded at first but plans to seek public funding in the future.

See also 
 Intermarium
 Three Seas Initiative

References 

Educational institutions established in 2021
2021 establishments in Poland
Universities established in the 2020s
Universities and colleges in Warsaw